Membrane mirrors are mirrors made on thin films of material, such as metallized PET film. They can be used as components in adaptive optics systems.

See also
 Solar sail

References

Spacecraft propulsion